Jurgis Hardingsonas (24 September 1892 –  1936, Germany ) was a Lithuanian footballer who competed in the 1924 Summer Olympics, they lost that match 0-9 against Switzerland and didn't advance any further in the tournament, two days later they played Egypt in a friendly in Paris and lost 0-10, Hardingsonas didn't play international football again.

References

1892 births
Lithuanian footballers
Lithuania international footballers
Footballers at the 1924 Summer Olympics
Olympic footballers of Lithuania
Association football defenders
1936 deaths